Camponotus chromaiodes, known generally as, the ferruginous carpenter ant or red carpenter ant, is a species of ant in the family Formicidae.

References

Further reading

External links

 

chromaiodes
Articles created by Qbugbot
Insects described in 1995